The 2012–13 Minnesota Golden Gophers men's basketball team represented the University of Minnesota in the 2012-13 college basketball season. It was the sixth and final season for team's head coach, Tubby Smith, who was fired shortly after the conclusion of the season. The Golden Gophers, members of the Big Ten Conference, played their home games at Williams Arena in Minneapolis, Minnesota. They finished with a record of 21–13 overall, 8–10 in Big Ten for a three-way tie for 7th place. They lost to Illinois in the first round in the 2013 Big Ten Conference men's basketball tournament. They were invited to the 2013 NCAA Division I men's basketball tournament and lost in the third round to Florida.

Coach Tubby Smith's firing was announced on March 25, 2013. On April 3, 2013, it was verbally agreed upon that Richard Pitino would become the new Gophers basketball coach.

Roster

2012–13 schedule and results

|-
! colspan="9" style="text-align: center; background:#800000" | Exhibition 

|-
! colspan="9" style="text-align: center; background:#800000"|Regular season

|-
! colspan="9" style="text-align: center; background:#800000"|Big Ten regular season

|-
! colspan="9" style="text-align: center; background:#800000"|2013 Big Ten tournament
 
|-
! colspan="9" style="text-align: center; background:#800000"|2013 NCAA tournament

National Rankings

References

Minnesota Golden Gophers men's basketball seasons
Minnesota
Minnesota
Minnesota Golden Gophers men's basketball
Minnesota Golden Gophers men's basketball